Shorea montigena is a species of plant in the family Dipterocarpaceae. It is a tree found in Sulawesi and the Maluku Islands in Indonesia.

References

montigena
Trees of Sulawesi
Trees of the Maluku Islands
Critically endangered plants
Taxonomy articles created by Polbot